The Chronicle-Journal is the daily newspaper in Thunder Bay, Ontario, Canada. Unlike many Canadian newspapers, it does not use the city's name in its masthead. The paper has an average weekday circulation of 17,200.

The paper is owned by Continental Newspapers Canada Ltd.

History 

The Chronicle-Journal name is a combination of the names of the Daily Times-Journal of Fort William and the News-Chronicle of Port Arthur.

The Daily Times-Journal was created in 1899 when the Fort William Journal merged with the Fort William Times. In 1902 the Daily Times-Journal became the second newspaper in Canada to adopt a weekly payment plan for paper carriers. The News-Chronicle was first published in 1899.

In 1972, after the amalgamation of Port Arthur and Fort William in the city of Thunder Bay, the newspapers merged and became the morning daily Chronicle-Journal and evening daily Times-News. The newspaper relocated to its current building in 1977. On April 17, 1996, publication of the evening Times-News ceased. David Radler is the principal owner of Continental Newspapers, which includes The Chronicle-Journal. Since early 2006, the newspaper's editorial staff has shrunk from 23 employees to its current level, of 4 or 5. At one point, the newspaper's editorial department only had one reporter working in the entire city of Thunder Bay.

See also 
Canadan Sanomat
List of newspapers in Canada

References

External links
The Chronicle-Journal

Newspapers published in Thunder Bay
Newspapers established in 1972
Continental Newspapers
Daily newspapers published in Ontario
1972 establishments in Ontario